Cyngen may refer to:

Cyngen ap Cadell (d. 855), prince of Powys
Cyngen Glodrydd, 6th century Welsh ruler